Paris Saint-Germain Handball (PSG) is a French professional handball club founded in 1941, and based in the city of Paris in France. The club is the handball department of Paris Saint-Germain.

PSG play in the highest tier of French handball, the LNH Division 1. Their home ground for LNH matches is Stade Pierre de Coubertin, which has a seating capacity of 3,400 spectators. For EHF Champions League matches, the club play at Halle Georges Carpentier, which has a seating capacity of 4,500 spectators.

Initially called Patriotes d'Asnières (1941–1942), the club has gone through several name changes: Asnières Sports (1942–1987), Paris-Racing-Asnières (1987–1988), Paris-Asnières (1988–1992), PSG-Asnières (1992–2002), and Paris Handball (2002–2012). After being bought by Paris Saint-Germain owners Qatar Sports Investments (QSI) in 2012, the club became Paris Saint-Germain Handball.

Since its inception, the club has won 23 titles. Domestically, Paris SG have clinched 9 LNH Division 1 titles, six French Cups, three Coupes de la Ligue, a record four French Super Cups and two LNH Division 2 titles. They are the only club in French handball to have ever won all their matches in LNH Division 1 in a season, which they did in the 2021–22 season. In international club handball, the capital side finished runners-up in the 2016–17 edition of the Champions League. PSG also have a reserve team that currently play in the Championnat National 1, which serves as the third tier of French handball. They have played in Nationale 1 since 2017–18, after clinching the Championnat National 2 title and winning promotion during the 2016–17 season.

History

First titles (1941–2012)

The Parisian club was founded in 1941. Initially, it took the name of Patriotes d'Asnières before becoming Asnières Sports one year later. Asnières Sports was presided by Christian Picard, whose son Gérard Picard took over during the 1975–1976 season and remained president until 2003.

In 1987, the club's management succeeded in convincing the Paris City Council to partner Asnières Sports and create a major handball team in the capital. This resulted in the Hauts-de-Seine team moving to Paris and being renamed Paris-Racing-Asnières then Paris-Asnières. Relegated in 1989, Paris-Asnières immediately bounced back to the top flight in 1990 after winning the D2 title. At the time, the club's most notable players were future French internationals Jackson Richardson and Patrick Cazal.

In 1992, the club came under the management of Paris Saint-Germain Football Club, a partnership that lasted 10 years. This led to another name change, and Paris-Asnières became PSG-Asnières. PSG-Asnières finished second in the LNH Division 1 during the 1995–96 season and then reached the French Cup final in 2001, losing to Montpellier.

During that time, PSG-Asnières managed to attract several international players such as Stéphane Stoecklin, Denis Lathoud, Gaël Monthurel, Nenad Peruničić and Olivier Girault. The latter set up home in Paris in 1999, playing for the club until 2008 and then coaching the team until 2011.

Under yet another name, Paris Handball began 2002 with new club owner Louis Nicollin. During the next decade, the club played in the EHF Champions League during the 2005–06 season, and won its first major trophy in 2007 with star player Kévynn Nyokas. Paris Handball registered a 28-21 win in the French Cup final over Pays d'Aix.

But there were tough times too. At the end of the 2008–09 season, the club was relegated to Division 2. Paris Handball won the LNH Division 2 the very next season and rejoined the top clubs. In 2012, the team narrowly avoided relegation in the last round of play.

Domestic dominance (2012–)

After being bought by Paris Saint-Germain Football Club owners Qatar Sports Investments (QSI) in 2012, the club became Paris Saint-Germain Handball. Under the initiative of Nasser Al-Khelaifi, a new management and playing team was assembled. Jean-Claude Blanc was named General Manager, Philippe Gardent signed as first-team manager, and a host of international stars arrived at the French capital, including Didier Dinart, Luc Abalo, Samuel Honrubia, Mikkel Hansen, Marko Kopljar , José Manuel Sierra and Antonio García.

In the 2012–13 season, PSG claimed their maiden league success, which also meant the club secured a spot in the EHF Champions League. However, PSG were denied the double by Montpellier in the French Cup final.

Big-name signings kept coming in the 2013–14 season with the arrivals of Daniel Narcisse, Igor Vori, Jakov Gojun, Fahrudin Melić and Gábor Császár. PSG reached the Champions League quarterfinals for the first time in its history, but failed to keep up the pace with Dunkerque in the league. Despite this, the season finished on a high note, thanks to a victory in the French Cup final against Chambéry, adding a second national cup trophy to the club's honours.

In the 2014–15 season, new manager Zvonimir Serdarušić and star signing Nikola Karabatić led the capital club to its second league title following a nail-biting battle for top spot against Montpellier. PSG claimed the trophy on the last day of the season, after a win over Tremblay. The league crown rounded off a domestic treble, going alongside the French Cup and the French Super Cup that they had won after beating Nantes and Dunkerque, respectively. On the European stage, PSG's hopes were dashed, for a second time, by Veszprém in the Champions League semifinals.

PSG continued its winning ways in the 2015–16 season by claiming a second French Super Cup and a third league title. However, the crowning moment was reaching the Champions League Final4 for the first time in its history. Along the way, the club downed THW Kiel at the Sparkassen-Arena, where the German side had been undefeated for four years; topped its group for the first time ever; and trumped Kiel in the third-place play-off. Additionally, Mikkel Hansen set a new record for goals in a Champions League season, with no fewer than 141 strikes to his name.

In the 2021–22 season they finished off LNH Division 1 with 60 points on 30 matches, being the only team ever in the french league to achieve that.

Crest, colours, supporters

Naming history

Kits

Identity

Parent club Paris Saint-Germain represent both the city of Paris and the nearby royal town of Saint-Germain-en-Laye. As a result, red, blue and white are the club's traditional colours. The red and blue are Parisian colours, a nod to revolutionary figures Lafayette and Jean Sylvain Bailly, and the white is a symbol of French royalty and Saint-Germain-en-Laye.

On the club's crest, the Eiffel Tower in red and the blue background represent Paris, while the fleur de lys in white is a hint to the coat of arms of Saint-Germain-en-Laye. The fleur de lys is a royal symbol as well and recalls that French King Louis XIV was born in the town. Throughout its history, PSG have brandished several different crests, but all of them have featured the club's three historical colours. Likewise, PSG's most iconic shirts have been predominantly red, blue or white, with the remaining two colours included as well. The club's official mascot, Germain the Lynx, also sports PSG's traditional colours.

Grounds

Stadium

The Stade Pierre de Coubertin, with a seating capacity of 3,400 spectators, serves as PSG's home stadium for LNH Division 1 matches. For EHF Champions League games, on the other hand, the club use Halle Georges Carpentier as its home venue. It has a seating capacity of 4,500 spectators.

Training facilities

In 2023, the club's first team and academy will move to the Paris Saint-Germain Training Center. On the second plateau of the new training ground and sports complex handball players – professionals as well as academy attendees – will enjoy the use of two fields, a stand with a capacity of 250 spectators, fitness rooms, recovery areas, staff offices and meeting rooms.

Supporters

Between 2010 and 2016, with the impossibility for fan groups to support parent club Paris Saint-Germain (men's football team) at home or away, the PSG faithful turned to Paris Saint-Germain Féminine, and to a lesser extent to the Paris Saint-Germain Academy sides, being the very rare case of fan groups supporting their club's women's football team. Liberté Pour les Abonnés and Nautecia, which were among several groups that reunited Boulogne and Auteuil supporters, were behind this initiative. PSG ultras have also occasionally attended big matches of the club's handball team ever since it was bought by PSG owners Qatar Sports Investments (QSI) in 2012.

Ownership and finances

Tamim bin Hamad Al Thani, ruler of Qatar, bought 70% of parent club Paris Saint-Germain through state-owned shareholding organization Qatar Sports Investments (QSI). Colony Capital (29%) and Butler (1%) remained minority shareholders. In March 2012, QSI purchased the remaining 30% stake to become PSG's sole shareholder, valuing the club at €100m. PSG thus became one of the wealthiest clubs in the world. Paris Saint-Germain Handball (previously called Paris Handball) were then bought by PSG owners QSI in 2012.

In late June 2019, Paris Saint-Germain announced a long-term contract extension with kit manufacturer Nike, which is now one of European football's most lucrative and the biggest sponsorship agreement in the club's history. PSG are tied to the American brand until 2032 and will more than triple their previous €25m deal with an annual figure in excess of €80 million. PSG said the new Nike deal will cover the men's and women's football teams, as well as their handball outfit.

Honours

As of the 2021–22 season.

Domestic

LNH Division 1
Winners (9): 2012–13, 2014–15, 2015–16, 2016–17, 2017–18, 2018–19, 2019–20, 2020–21, 2021–22
Runners-up (3): 1995–96, 2004–05, 2013–14

LNH Division 2
Winners (2): 1989–90, 2009–10
Runners-up (1): 1985–86

Championnat National 2 (Academy)
Winners (1): 2016–17

Coupe de France
Winners (6): 2006–07, 2013–14, 2014–15, 2017–18, 2020–21, 2021–22
Runners-up (4): 2000–01, 2007–08, 2012–13, 2015–16

Coupe de la Ligue
Winners (3): 2016–17, 2017–18, 2018–19
Runners-up (3): 2004–05, 2005–06, 2015–16

Trophée des Champions
Winners (4; record): 2014, 2015, 2016, 2019
Runners-up (2): 2017, 2022

European

EHF Champions League
Runners-up: 2016–17 
Third place: 2017–18, 2019–20, 2020–21

Worldwide

2016 IHF Super Globe
Runners-up (1): 2016

Doubles and Trebles

 Double (D1 and CdF)
 Winners (4): 2014–15, 2017–18, 2020–21, 2021–22

League and League Cup Double (D1 and CdL)
Winners (2): 2016–17, 2018–19

Domestic Cup Double (CdF and CdL)
Winners (1): 2017–18

Domestic Treble (D1, CdF and CdL)
Winners (1): 2017–18

European record
Note All matches ending with a 10–0 or 5–5 results were assessed by the EHF.

First-team

Current squad
Squad for the 2022–23 season

Goalkeepers
 12  Andreas Palicka
 16  Jannick Green
Left Wingers
9  Adama Keïta
 20  Mathieu Grebille
Right Wingers
 14  Ferran Solé
 19  David Balaguer
Line players
 15  Henrik Toft Hansen
 21  Kamil Syprzak
 22  Luka Karabatic (c)

Left Backs
 13  Petar Nenadić
 28  Yoann Gibelin
 71  Elohim Prandi 
Centre Backs
6  Luc Steins
7  Sadou Ntanzi
 44  Nikola Karabatić 
Right Backs
 10  Dainis Krištopāns
 23  Dominik Máthé

Transfers
Transfers for the 2023–24 season

Joining
  Kent Robin Tønnesen (RB) (from  SC Pick Szeged)

Leaving
  Petar Nenadić (LB) (to  Dinamo București) ?
  Dainis Kristopans (RB) (to  MT Melsungen)
  Henrik Toft Hansen (P) (to  Mors-Thy Håndbold)

Notable former players

Academy

Current squad

As of the 2022–23 season.

Goalkeepers
 1  Stanis Soullier
 45  Léo Villain
Left Wingers
 90  Léo Plantin
Right Wingers
 3  Valentin Bzdynga
Line players
 98  Gautier Loredon

Left Backs
 8  Noa Narcisse
 17  Noah Lenclume
 47  Wallem Peleka
Centre Backs
 4  Baptiste Clay
 26  Louis Perreux
Right Backs
 27  Tony Mendy
 33  Victor Crenn

Personnel

As of 30 December 2020.

Current staff

Presidents

Managers

References

External links

 
 

French handball clubs
Paris Saint-Germain F.C.